Arroyo Seco is a census-designated place in Taos County near Taos, New Mexico. Arroyo Seco's economy is based on tourism and services to residents of retirement and vacation homes.

Arroyo Seco has a post office, with the ZIP code 87514. The 87514 ZIP Code Tabulation Area had a population of 1,310 at the 2000 census, with 996 housing units, a land area of 53.63 sq. miles, a water area of 0.05 sq. mile, and a population density of 24.43 people per sq. mile at Census 2000. Arroyo Seco's elevation is 7,634 feet.

Demographics

History
Arroyo Seco was settled in 1804, on a Spanish land grant made on October 7, 1745. The Church of the Most Holy Trinity was completed in 1834 and has recently been restored.

Overlooking Arroyo Seco stands Lucero Peak, a  rock formation. Housed in the Peak is a cave that is sacred to the local Native American population of Taos Pueblo. The cave inspired D.H. Lawrence's short story "The Woman who Rode Away" after he visited it in May 1924 with Mabel Dodge Luhan, her husband Tony, and Lawrence's wife Frieda.

Education
It is within Taos Municipal Schools, which operates Taos High School.

Events
Arroyo Seco's annual Fourth of July parade is locally popular.

In culture
The words "She wrote her name there on my windshield, Just to remind me where she was from' Tina Louise, Arroyo Seco, New Mexico, 1971" in the Commander Cody and the Lost Planet Airmen song "Tina Louise" from their 1976 album Tales from the Ozone.

Gallery

References

External links

 Arroyo Seco village website
 Arroyo Seco profile at Sangres.com, with photo gallery

Census-designated places in Taos County, New Mexico
Census-designated places in New Mexico
Unincorporated communities in Taos County, New Mexico
Unincorporated communities in New Mexico